The 1995 Rothmans Malta Grand Prix was the second edition of the professional invitational snooker tournament, which took place from 30 October to 5 November 1995. The tournament was played at the Jerma Palace Hotel in Marsaskala, Malta.

Peter Ebdon won the title, defeating John Higgins 7–4 in the final.

Main draw

Century breaks

 134  Tony Drago
 133  Darren Morgan
 123  Ken Doherty

References

Malta Grand Prix
Malta Grand Prix
Grand Prix
Malta Grand Prix
Malta Grand Prix